Gayathri Ashokan is an Indian poster designer and screenwriter who works in Malayalam cinema. He is considered as a pioneer in poster designing art along with P. N. Menon in Malayalam film industry. His debut design was for director Padmarajan' s Koodevide where he created a poster with all characters appearing in postage stamp. The posters created a very good impact among filmgoers. He has designed promotional posters for over 700 films including Tamil films. Ashokan introduced the airbrush concept in Malayalam posters.

Career

Ashokan started off his career as a designer for books and magazines based at Kottayam and he later started doing posters in the name of the studio he worked. The posters of most of the films produced and distributed by Jubilee Pictures, Geo Movies, Binny Films, Central Pictures and Century Films were designed by Ashokan, on behalf of the Studio. He has also worked as a lay out designer for Cut-Cut Magazine, published from Kottayam.

His first break as an independent poster designer happened with Koodevide, followed by Swanthamevide Bandhamevide, Sandarbham, Ente Upasana and finally his 10th film My Dear Kuttichathan. Eight of those ten films became a success at the box office establishing Ashokan as a prominent designer.
 
Gayathri Ashokan's work for Devaraagam, Kala Pani and Thazhvaram was much appreciated. He is also the screenwriter for the Mohanlal starrer action thriller Douthyam, released in 1989. He also wrote the screenplay of Itha Samayamayi, but was uncredited.

Selected filmography
Kalikkalam
Koodevide 
Parannu Parannu Parannu 
Sandarbham 
Swanthamevide Bandhamevide 
Vannu Kandu Keezhadakki 
Oru Nokku Kaanan 
Muthaaramkunnu P.O 
Nirakkoottu 
Namukku Paarkkaan Munthirithoppukal 
Snehamulla Simham 
Ee Kaikalil 
Chidambaram 
Kariyilakkaattu Pole 
Onnu Muthal Poojyam Vare 
Shyama 
Anantharam 
Kadhaykku Pinnil 
1921 
Kudumbapuraanam 
Sangham 
Devaraagam
Kala Pani
Thazhvaram
My Dear Kuttichathan
Douthyam
Vellanakalude Nadu
New Delhi
Mathilukal
Thaniyavarthanam
Irupatham Noottandu
Oru CBI Diary kurippu 
Dinaraathrangal
Moonnaam Mura
Mrigaya
Vandanam 
Chithram 
Utharam 
Kireedam
Paadha Mudra
Varavelpu
Manu Uncle 
Ponmuttayidunna Thaaravu
Sargam
Samrajyam
Thenmavin Kombath
Chandralekha
His Highness Abdulla 
Aaraam Thamburan
FIR
Kilukkam

References

External links
 

Malayalam screenwriters
Film poster artists
Living people
1957 births